Syllepte opalisans is a moth in the family Crambidae. It was described by Cajetan Felder, Rudolf Felder and Alois Friedrich Rogenhofer in 1875. It is found in the Dominican Republic.

References

Moths described in 1875
opalisans
Moths of the Caribbean